The parallel mixed team competition of the 2020 Winter Youth Olympics was held at Les Diablerets on 15 January.

Participants

Bracket

References

External list

Bracket

Parallel mixed team